Rhobell Fawr is the site of an ancient volcano that was active during the Early Ordovician period in the Arenig range within the Snowdonia National Park.

Despite its modest height of 734 m (2,408 feet), it is a mountain with views of higher peaks all around, including the north face of Cadair Idris and distant Snowdon.

The paths are not well trodden, but there is a distinct path up from Bwlch Goriwared, a couple of miles north-north-east of the small village of Llanfachreth.

References

External links
 www.geograph.co.uk : photos of Rhobell Fawr and surrounding area

Mountains and hills of Snowdonia
Marilyns of Wales
Nuttalls
Hewitts of Wales
Volcanoes of Wales
Ordovician volcanoes
Brithdir and Llanfachreth
Mountains and hills of Gwynedd